Carlos Alberto Lobos Ubilla (born 21 February 1997) is a Chilean footballer who plays as a central midfielder for Huachipato in the Chilean Primera División.

Club career
Carlos made his debut at UC entered for the first time against Universidad de Concepcion in San Carlos de Apoquindo in 2014.

Honors

Club
Universidad Católica
 Primera División de Chile (4): 2016–A, 2016–C, 2018, 2019
 Supercopa de Chile (2): 2016, 2019

External links
 

1997 births
Living people
Chilean footballers
Club Deportivo Universidad Católica footballers
Everton de Viña del Mar footballers
C.D. Huachipato footballers
Chilean Primera División players
Chile youth international footballers
Chile under-20 international footballers
Footballers from Santiago
Association football midfielders